Yoshitaka is a masculine Japanese given name and a Japanese surname.

Possible writings
Yoshitaka can be written using many different combinations of kanji characters. Here are some examples: 

義孝, "justice, filial piety"
義隆, "justice, noble"
義貴, "justice, precious"
義高, "justice, tall"
吉孝, "good luck,filial piety"
吉隆, "good luck, noble"
吉貴, "good luck, precious"
吉高, "good luck, tall"
善孝, "virtuous, filial piety"
善隆, "virtuous, noble"
善貴, "virtuous, precious"
善高, "virtuous, tall"
芳孝, "fragrant/virtuous, filial piety"
芳隆, "fragrant/virtuous, noble"
芳貴, "fragrant/virtuous, precious"
芳高, "fragrant/virtuous, tall"
好孝, "good/like something, filial piety"
喜孝, "rejoice, filial piety"
喜隆, "rejoice, noble"
慶隆, "congratulate, noble"
由貴, "reason, precious"
由高, "reason, tall"

The name can also be written in hiragana よしたか or katakana ヨシタカ.

Notable people with the given name Yoshitaka
, Japanese artist
, Japanese basketball player
, Japanese anesthesiologist
, Japanese footballer
, Japanese businessman
, Japanese daimyō
, Japanese video game composer and bass guitarist
, Japanese shogi player
, Japanese long-distance runner
, Japanese footballer
, Japanese footballer
, Japanese samurai
, Japanese daimyō
, Japanese baseball player
, Japanese politician
, Japanese video game designer
, Japanese middle-distance runner
, Japanese daimyō
, Japanese video game composer
, Japanese politician
, Japanese politician
, Japanese actor
, Japanese rugby sevens player
, Japanese footballer
, Japanese golfer

Notable people with the surname Yoshitaka
, Japanese judoka
, Japanese actress

Fictional characters
Yoshitaka Moriyama (森山 由孝), a character in the manga series Kuroko's Basketball
Yoshitaka Nakabayashi (中林 義貴), protagonist of the manga series He is my Master
Yoshitaka Waya (和谷 義高), character in Hikaru no Go

See also
 Yositaka

Japanese-language surnames
Japanese masculine given names